Sara Novak is an American educator and politician serving as a Democratic member of the Montana House of Representatives from the 77th district. She was first elected in November 2020.

Early life and education 
Novak was born and raised in Butte, Montana. After graduating from Butte High School in 1996, she earned a Bachelor of Science degree in education from the University of Montana Western and a Master of Education in counseling from Montana State University–Northern.

Career 
Outside of politics, Novak has worked as a special education teacher in Anaconda, Montana. She is also the special education director for Great Divide Education Services, an education cooperative based in Deer Lodge, Montana. Novak was elected to the Montana House of Representatives in November 2020 and assumed office on January 4, 2021.

References 

Living people
People from Butte, Montana
University of Montana Western alumni
Montana State University–Northern alumni
Democratic Party members of the Montana House of Representatives
Women state legislators in Montana
People from Anaconda, Montana
1978 births
21st-century American women